The year 2010 is the 9th year in the history of the Maximum Fighting Championship, a mixed martial arts promotion based in Canada. In 2010 Maximum Fighting Championship held 4 events beginning with, MFC 24: HeatXC.

Title fights

Events list

MFC 24: HeatXC

MFC 24: HeatXC was an event held on February 26, 2010 at the River Cree Resort and Casino in Edmonton, Alberta.

Results

MFC 25: Vindication

MFC 25: Vindication was an event held on May 7, 2010 at the Edmonton Expo Centre in Edmonton, Alberta.

Results

MFC 26: Retribution

MFC 26: Retribution was an event held on September 10, 2010 at the River Cree Resort and Casino in Edmonton, Alberta.

Results

MFC 27: Breaking Point

MFC 27: Breaking Point was an event held on November 12, 2010 at the River Cree Resort and Casino in Edmonton, Alberta.

Results

See also 
 Maximum Fighting Championship
 List of Maximum Fighting Championship events

References

Maximum Fighting Championship events
2010 in mixed martial arts
Events in Edmonton